Mount Moriah is a  mountain in the northern Snake Range of eastern White Pine County, Nevada, United States. It is the fifth-highest mountain in the state, and also ranks as the ninth-most topographically prominent peak in the state.  It is located in the Mount Moriah Wilderness administered by the Humboldt-Toiyabe National Forest.

Geography
Mount Moriah rises over  vertical feet above the Snake Valley on its east flank, and the Spring Valley to its west. The summit is the highest point in the Humboldt-Toiyabe National Forest.

Immediately to the north is a large flat sub-alpine area called The Table, which supports an ancient stand of Great Basin Bristlecone Pine (Pinus longaeva).

U.S. Route 6  and U.S. Route 50 traverse the Sacramento Pass nearby, which divides the northern and southern sections of the Snake Range. To the south of the pass are Great Basin National Park and Wheeler Peak.

References

External links 
 

Moriah
Moriah
Moriah
Moriah